Tanjung Bidara is a state constituency in Malacca, Malaysia, that has been represented in the Malacca State Legislative Assembly.

The state constituency was first contested in 2004 and is mandated to return a single Assemblyman to the Melaka State Legislative Assembly under the first-past-the-post voting system. , the State Assemblyman for Tanjung Bidara is Ab Rauf Yusoh from the United Malays National Organisation (UMNO) which is part of the state's ruling coalition, Barisan Nasional (BN).

Definition 
The Tanjung Bidara constituency contains the polling districts of Kampung Pulau, Lubok Redan, Sungai Baru Tengah, Pengkalan Balak and Pasir Gembor.

Demographics

History

Polling districts
According to the gazette issued on 31 October 2022, the Tanjung Bidara constituency has a total of 5 polling districts.

Representation history

Election results

References

Malacca state constituencies